Oliver Unsöld (born 21 October 1973) is a German football former player and current manager who played as a defender.

Career

Unsold started his career with SSV Ulm.

References

1973 births
Living people
German footballers
SSV Ulm 1846 players
FC Gundelfingen players
SpVgg Au/Iller players
SpVgg Greuther Fürth players
SSV Reutlingen 05 players
Sportfreunde Siegen players
Association football defenders
Bundesliga players
2. Bundesliga players
German football managers
SSV Ulm 1846 managers